Lee Yun-chul (born 28 March 1982 in Gunsan) is a South Korean athlete who specialises in the hammer throw. He represented his country at the 2011 World Championships without qualifying for the final.

His personal best of 73.77 metres is the current national record.

Competition record

References

1982 births
Living people
South Korean male hammer throwers
Athletes (track and field) at the 2002 Asian Games
Athletes (track and field) at the 2006 Asian Games
Athletes (track and field) at the 2010 Asian Games
Athletes (track and field) at the 2014 Asian Games
Athletes (track and field) at the 2018 Asian Games
World Athletics Championships athletes for South Korea
Korea National Sport University alumni
Asian Games competitors for South Korea
People from Gunsan
Sportspeople from North Jeolla Province
21st-century South Korean people